The Gaeltacht Quarter in Belfast, Northern Ireland, United Kingdom is an area surrounding the Falls Road in the west of the city. A Gaeltacht is an area where the Irish language is spoken. The Quarter aims to promote Irish language and Irish culture in the area and to develop associated tourist attractions.

Throughout the Quarter many Irish-medium institutions are located: Gaelscoil an Lonnáin, Gaelscoil na bhFál, Bunscoil an tSléibhe Dhuibh and Coláiste Feirste. A third-level institution in the area is Coláiste Ollscoile Naomh Muire.

Proposals for a Gaeltacht Quarter began in 2002 as a recommendation of the Joint West Belfast/Greater Shankill Task Force. The plan was then adopted by the Department of Culture, Arts and Leisure and Belfast City Council.

Key sites and events in the Gaeltacht quarter include Cultúrlann McAdam Ó Fiaich, An Ceathrú Póilí, Conway Mill and Féile an Phobail. Most businesses in the Gaeltacht Quarter have Irish language or bilingual signage. There is also an Irish language radio station Raidió Fáilte.

See also
Shaw's Road
Belfast quarters

References

External links

Belfast
Quarters of Belfast